Komo-Océan is a department of Estuaire Province in Gabon. The population was 553 in 2013.

Geography 
At department, main towns:

 Océan Gongoué
 Remboué Gongoué.

References 

Departments of Gabon